Crabs Hill is a village in Saint Mary Parish, Antigua and Barbuda.

Demographics 
Crabs Hill has one enumeration district, ED 81800 CrabbHill.

Census Data (2011) 
Source:

Individual

Household 
There are 48 households in Crabs Hill.

References 

Saint Mary Parish, Antigua and Barbuda
Populated places in Antigua and Barbuda